The 1923 Rice Owls football team was an American football team that represented Rice University as a member of the Southwest Conference (SWC) during the 1923 college football season. In its eleventh season under head coach Philip Arbuckle, the team compiled a 3–5 record (1–4 against SWC opponents) and was outscored by a total of 94 to 35.

Schedule

References

Rice
Rice
Rice Owls football seasons
Rice Owl football